EMI Hemisphere is a world music record label imprint of EMI.

Founded by Gerald Seligman in 1993, it drew on music from the international catalogues of EMI Records, supplemented by its own signings and some outside licensing. It was one of the first, international labels to extensively compile music of the world.  Seligman ran it until 2000 out of London, UK. From there it lasted a few more releases and has since ceased activity. Seligman produced or executive-produced seventy six releases for the label, and is now General Director of WOMEX, the world music expo, based in Berlin.

Circa 2000 it initiated the best-selling The Story of Series, including titles focusing on tango, fado, flamenco, bossa nova, Arab, French, Cuban and Greek popular song performances. Aside from anthologies, it has re-issued performances by individual artists. The label is currently owned by the Parlophone Label Group.

See also
 World music
 List of record labels
 WOMEX

References

1993 establishments in the United Kingdom
British record labels
World music record labels
EMI